Javier Herrera Corona (born 15 May 1968) is a Mexican prelate of the Catholic Church who works in the diplomatic service of the Holy See.

Biography
Javier Herrera Corona was born on 15 May 1968 in Autlán, Mexico. He was ordained a priest for the Diocese of Autlán on 21 September 1993.

He entered the diplomatic service of the Holy See on 1 July 2003, and served in the pontifical representations in Pakistan, Peru, Kenya, Great Britain, and the Philippines and as unofficial representative in Hong Kong.

On 5 February 2022, Pope Francis appointed him Titular Archbishop of Vulturaria and Apostolic Nuncio to the Republic of the Congo and Gabon.

See also
 List of heads of the diplomatic missions of the Holy See

References

Living people
1968 births
Apostolic Nuncios to the Republic of the Congo
Apostolic Nuncios to Gabon
Mexican Roman Catholic archbishops